Dunagan is a surname. Notable people with the surname include:

Deanna Dunagan (born 1940), American actress
Donnie Dunagan (born 1934), American former child actor
Kern W. Dunagan (1934–1991), American military officer
Sandra Deal (née Dunagan), wife of Georgia governor Nathan Deal